Boris Romanovich Rotenberg (born 3 January 1957) is a Russian businessman and oligarch. He is co-owner (with his brother Arkady Rotenberg) of the SGM (StroyGazMontazh) group, the largest construction company for gas pipelines and electrical power supply lines in Russia. He was listed by Forbes as Russia's 69th wealthiest person in 2016 with a net worth of $1.07 billion. He is considered a close confidant of president Vladimir Putin.

Since 2014, following Russia's annexation of Crimea, Rotenberg has been subject to sanctions by the United States government. After Russia's invasion of Ukraine in 2022, the UK government has also imposed sanctions on Rotenberg.

Biography
Rotenberg was born in 1957 in a family of Jewish descent. He was very involved in martial arts between 1968 and 1978, particularly judo. He trained alongside Vladimir Putin and won several awards for the Soviet Union. In 1992, he became a professional judo trainer in Helsinki. In 1998, he returned to St. Petersburg.

In 2001, he and his brother founded the SMP bank, which operates in 40 Russian cities with over 100 branches, more than half of them in the Moscow area. SMP oversees the operation of more than 900 ATM machines.

Based on his friendship with Vladimir Putin, his company became closely aligned with Gazprom. Rotenberg is a member of the St. Petersburg Connection, a powerful energy lobby under the leadership of Putin.

He was involved in 20 construction projects for the Sochi Winter Olympics worth 5 billion Euro. The largest site was the coastal highway to Adler, where the Olympic Park was constructed for the numerous sport arenas.

From July 2013 to 17 July 2015, Rotenberg was the president of FC Dynamo Moscow. He is also the president of the Russian Judo federation. Mr. Rotenberg's two older sons are Roman Rotenberg, chief of marketing for the ice hockey club SKA St. Petersburg and Boris Rotenberg, a football player of the FC Lokomotiv Moscow. After leaving Dynamo, he bought another football club, FC Dynamo Saint Petersburg, which was eventually moved to Sochi under the name PFC Sochi and was promoted to the Russian Premier League for the 2019–20 season.

As a result of the 2014 Crimean crisis, the federal government of the United States under Barack Obama blacklisted the Rotenberg brothers and other close friends of the Russian president, including Sergei Ivanov and Gennadi Timchenko. In July 2014, the European Union also blacklisted Boris Romanovich Rotenberg's company Giprotransmost for conducting the feasibility study of the construction of a bridge from Russia to the Autonomous Republic of Crimea.

On 27 March 2014, both Visa and MasterCard executed the boycott of SMP Bank, Investcapitalbank and Investitsionny Soyuz (Investment Union) bank. However, just a few days later, it was announced that the institutions do not meet the criteria under which the U.S. Treasury introduces economic sanctions.

Rotenberg was named in the Panama Papers.

Rotenberg also holds Finnish citizenship.

His nephew, Igor Rotenberg is a Russian billionaire businessman.

In January 2020, Finnish national broadcaster YLE reported that Rotenberg had lost a court case against four Finnish banks in Helsinki District Court. Rotenberg had complained that the banks did not grant him basic banking services and he was not able to make even small transfers using his Finnish accounts. Helsinki District Court resolved the lawsuit by deciding Rotenberg has no right to basic banking services because he does not permanently reside in European Economic Area. Rotenberg was ordered to pay the four banks' legal costs of 530,000 euros.

On 22 February 2022, Boris along with his nephew Igor Rotenberg had sanctions imposed on them by the United Kingdom government as a result of the Russo-Ukrainian crisis. On 3 March, the United States imposed sanctions on Rotenberg, his wife, and sons. In April 2022, Rotenberg had sanctions imposed on him by the EU.

Motorsport 
SMP Bank has sponsored auto racing teams under the brand SMP Racing. Russian drivers like Mikhail Aleshin, Sergey Sirotkin and Vitaly Petrov have competed in Formula 1, Formula 2, the FIA World Endurance Championship, IndyCar Series and the European Le Mans Series.

Rotenberg also owns BR Engineering, a race car constructor.

Wealth 
In January 2022 Forbes estimated his net worth to be $1.2B USD. He owned a Bombardier Challenger 300 registered M-ARRH however in 2019 it was seized by Credit Suisse and marketed for sale by Boutsen Aviation due to Rotenberg having sanctions put on him.

References

External links
 Oliver Bilger: Krim-Krise, Die Angst vor dem Wirtschaftskrieg wächst, Die Zeit, 21 March 2014.

1957 births
Living people
BP people
Russian billionaires
Russian businesspeople in the oil industry
Russian racing drivers
European Le Mans Series drivers
Russian Jews
Businesspeople from Saint Petersburg
Finnish people of Russian-Jewish descent
Naturalized citizens of Finland
Russian-speaking Finns
People named in the Paradise Papers
Russian individuals subject to the U.S. Department of the Treasury sanctions
Russian individuals subject to European Union sanctions
Russian oligarchs
SMP Racing drivers
AF Corse drivers